The Tunisian-Algerian Wars were a set of wars fought between the Regency of Algiers, and the Regency of Tunis.

Pre-1670 conflicts 

 Algerian-Tunisian war (1627)

After 1670 Algiers went through several reforms and gained autonomy. After a short civil war in 1710, Algiers became De facto independent, or quasi independent. While the other wars are linked to each other, this one isn't, and is a standalone war. Tunis gained a large amount of autonomy after 1705.

Post-1670 conflicts 

 Algerian-Tunisian War (1694)
 Maghrebi war (1699-1702)
 Algerian-Tunisian War (1705)

Conflicts of the 18th century and the 19th century lead to a peace treaty in 1817, where the two sides recognized each other, Algiers waives the payment of the tribute from Tunis, and both sides renounce any territorial claim:

 Algerian-Tunisian War (1735)
 Algerian-Tunisian war (1756)
 Algerian-Tunisian War (1807)
 Algerian-Tunisian naval war (1811)

Wars involving Algeria
Wars involving Tunisia